Richard Leach may refer to:

 Richard Leach (hymnwriter) (born 1953), American hymn writer and poet
 Richard Leach (physician) (fl. 1980s–2010s), British consultant physician and professor
 Rick Leach (baseball) (born 1957), college football player and professional baseball player

See also
 Rick Leach (born 1964), American tennis player and coach
 Richard Leach Maddox (1816–1902), English photographer and physician